Dr. Manmohan Singh is an Indian economist, academic and politician who served as the Prime Minister of India for two consecutive terms (2004–09 and 2009–14). Dr. Manmohan Singh held prominent posts in different organisations and received several honours for his work even before beginning his political career. He held various posts such as an advisor to the Foreign Trade Ministry, Chief Economic Advisor in the Ministry of Finance, Governor of the Reserve Bank of India, and head of the Planning Commission. As the finance minister in the P. V. Narasimha Rao government in the 1990s, he carried out several structural reforms that liberalised India's economy. Dr. Manmohan Singh was re-elected as the prime minister in 2009. He is the only prime minister since Jawaharlal Nehru to be re-elected after completing a full five-year term. Dr. Manmohan Singh is also the first and only Sikh to hold the office.

Born on 26 September 1932 in Gah (British India), Dr. Manmohan Singh received his early education from the Hindu College, Amritsar, where his family migrated after the Partition of India. From 1966 to 1969, he worked for the United Nations Conference on Trade and Development (UNCTAD). Later, Dr. Manmohan Singh worked as a professor of International Trade at the Delhi School of Economics from 1969 to 1971. In 1972, he was appointed as the Chief Economic Adviser to the Ministry of Finance. He became a secretary in the Ministry of Finance in 1976. From 1980 to 1982, he worked for the Planning Commission of India. He served as the governor of the Reserve Bank of India from 16 September 1982 to 14 January 1985.

In 1985, Dr. Manmohan Singh was appointed as the deputy chairman of the Planning Commission of India, a post he held till 1987. From 1987 to 1990, Dr. Manmohan Singh worked as the secretary general of the South Commission, an independent economic think-tank based in Geneva, Switzerland. In 1990, Dr. Manmohan Singh became the Adviser on Economic Affairs to the Prime Minister, following his return to India. In 1991, he was appointed as the chairman of the University Grants Commission (UGC). Later that year, Prime Minister P.V. Narasimha Rao appointed him the Finance Minister of India, in his government—a post Dr. Manmohan Singh held until 1996. Despite strong opposition, as finance minister, he was successful in implementing economic reforms aimed at enhancing productivity and liberalising of India's economy. In 1993, Dr. Manmohan Singh led Indian delegations to the Commonwealth Heads of Government Meeting in Cyprus and to the World Conference on Human Rights in Vienna.

Dr. Manmohan Singh was first elected to the upper house of Parliament, the Rajya Sabha, in 1991 by the legislature of the state of Assam; he was re-elected in 1995, 2001 and 2007. In the 2004 General Elections, the Indian National Congress party joined some allies to form the United Progressive Alliance (UPA) and defeated the BJP (Bharatiya Janata Party). Congress leader, Sonia Gandhi recommended Dr. Manmohan Singh's name for the post of Prime Minister and on 22 May 2004, he became the 14th Prime Minister of India. In 2009, UPA was again successful in forming the government in the 15th Lok Sabha elections, and he was re-elected as the Prime Minister of India on 22 May 2009.



List

State honours

Other awards

See also
Dr Manmohan Singh Scholarship

References

Manmohan Singh
Lists of Indian award winners